ALO (Aristide Loria) is an Italian fine artist based in London. 
He started his career in the UK capital where he began exhibiting with art galleries and painting external walls.
ALO also worked in Paris, New York and Berlin.
He had his first major solo show "Hail to the loser" at Saatchi Gallery in 2014, with which he started a continuous collaboration. His second solo show with the Saatchi Gallery was "Exit from Aden" in 2017.
"Liminal", his most recent solo show at Saatchi Gallery took place in November 2021 - February 2022.
ALO describes his style as "Urban expressionism".

Art exhibitions 

2022 – Eleven, solo show BSMT, London

2021 – Liminal, solo show Saatchi Gallery, London

2020 – Grace, solo show BSMT, London

2018 – Ave, solo show Le Cabinet D'Amateur, Paris

2017 – Exit from Aden - The Unshown Works, solo show Saatchi Gallery, London

2017 – Made in London, group show Le Cabinet D'Amateur, Paris

2017 – Exit from Aden, solo show Saatchi Gallery, London

2015 – Pop the Streets, Saatchi Gallery, London

2014 – Hail to the loser, Saatchi Gallery, London

2014 – Project M/6, Urban Nation, Berlin

2014 – Collicola On the Wall, Palazzo Collicola, Spoleto (Italy)

2013 – Spectrum, Stolen Space Gallery, London

2013 – Winter group show, Stolen Space Gallery, London

Press 

Inspiring City, Eleven the Exhibition by ALO at BSMT Space 

UP Magazine, ALO's Liminal Show at Saatchi Gallery 

Inspiring City, ALO Liminal exhibition at the Saatchi Gallery 

Inspiring City, Alo the Artist with his own brand of Urban Expressionism 

Widewalls, 'Grace', a solo show by ALO 

RNext, A Londra per dipingere su tela e su strada. Con Alo la street art fa il giro del mondo 

RNext, Repubblica.it - "NEXT" - Perugia Teatro Pavone Italy

Artribune, Dalle strade a Saatchi. Per Alo “è accaduto tutto molto in fretta

Auctions 

Urban Art Auction, Artcurial, Paris

Urban Art, Tajan, Paris

References

External links
ALO Official website

Italian artists
1981 births
Living people